Josef Schwitzer (born 31 October 1946) is an Austrian ice hockey player. He competed in the men's tournaments at the 1968 Winter Olympics and the 1976 Winter Olympics.

References

External links
 

1946 births
Living people
Austrian ice hockey players
Ice hockey players at the 1968 Winter Olympics
Ice hockey players at the 1976 Winter Olympics
Olympic ice hockey players of Austria
Sportspeople from Innsbruck